Pierre Fabre may refer to:

 Pierre Fabre (businessman), cosmetics executive who founded Laboratoires Pierre Fabre
 Laboratoires Pierre Fabre, a multinational pharmaceutical and cosmetics company founded in France
 Pierre Fabre, president of US-based Lone Signal
Pierre Fabre (actor) (1933–2006), French actor and screenwriter, married to Anna Karina